Felix Mitelman (born 26 August 1940) is a Swedish geneticist and is professor of clinical genetics in Lund, Sweden. He is best known for his pioneering work on chromosome changes in cancer.

He is a member of the Royal Swedish Academy of Sciences, the American Academy of Arts and Sciences, and the Polish Academy of Science. He was awarded the Jubilee Prize of the Swedish Medical Association in 1989, the Nordic Fernström prize in 2007, the Söderberg Prize in Medicine in 2008, and the European Society of Human Genetics Award in 2013. He is the Founding Editor (1989) and Editor-in-Chief of the scientific journal Genes, Chromosomes & Cancer.

Key publications
In total, Mitelman has co-authored more than 700 academic papers. Together with Fredrik Mertens and Bertil Johansson he maintains a database of all published chromosome aberrations in neoplastic disorders, with clinical features, now numbering more than 65,000 cases (as of December 2016). The Mitelman Database of Chromosome Aberrations and Gene Fusions in Cancer also contains information on the molecular genetic and clinical consequences of cancer-associated chromosome aberrations. The database is available on-line. (See below.)

Mitelman F: Catalog of Chromosome Aberrations in Cancer, Karger, Basel 1983, ; 2nd Ed. Alan R. Liss, Inc., New York 1985, ; 3rd Ed. Alan R. Liss, Inc., New York, 1988, ; 4th Ed. Wiley-Liss, New York, 1991, ; 5th Ed. Wiley-Liss, New York, 1994, ; 6th Ed., CD-ROM, Wiley-Liss, New York, 1998.
Mitelman, F: An International System for Human Cytogenetic Nomenclature. Karger, Basel, 1995, .
Heim S & Mitelman F: Cancer Cytogenetics, 1st Ed., Alan R. Liss, Inc., New York, 1987, ; 2nd Ed. Wiley-Liss, New York, 1995, ; 3rd Ed.Wiley-Blackwell, New York, 2009, ; 4th Ed. Wiley-Blackwell, New York, 2015, .

References
European Cytogeneticists Association Newsletter 21 (Jan 2008). Prestigious prize to E.C.A. board member Professor Felix Mitelman. p. 23.

External links 

Swedish geneticists
Academic staff of Lund University
Members of the Royal Swedish Academy of Sciences
Living people
1940 births